The 2000–01 Cypriot Third Division was the 30th season of the Cypriot third-level football league. ASIL Lysi won their 1st title.

Format
Fourteen teams participated in the 2000–01 Cypriot Third Division. All teams played against each other twice, once at their home and once away. The team with the most points at the end of the season crowned champions. The first three teams were promoted to the 2001–02 Cypriot Second Division and the last three teams were relegated to the 2001–02 Cypriot Fourth Division.

Point system
Teams received three points for a win, one point for a draw and zero points for a loss.

Changes from previous season
Teams promoted to 2000–01 Cypriot Second Division
 THOI Lakatamia
 Rotsidis Mammari
 Kinyras Empas

Teams relegated from 1999–2000 Cypriot Second Division
 PAEEK FC
 Iraklis Gerolakkou

Teams promoted from 1999–2000 Cypriot Fourth Division
 MEAP Nisou
 Elia Lythrodonta
 THOI Avgorou
 AMEP Parekklisia

Teams relegated to 2000–01 Cypriot Fourth Division
 Achyronas Liopetriou
 Ellinismos Akakiou
 Doxa Paliometochou

League standings

Results

See also
 Cypriot Third Division
 2000–01 Cypriot First Division
 2000–01 Cypriot Cup

Sources

Cypriot Third Division seasons
Cyprus
2000–01 in Cypriot football